Subhuman Beings on Tour!! is a live EP by American heavy metal band Skid Row. The EP was released in Japan in 1995 and consists of live performances from the Subhuman Race tour in support of their most recent album Subhuman Race.

Background
Some of the tracks on the EP were released as B-sides on the "Breakin' Down" single in some territories. The live performance of "Beat Yourself Blind" would go on to appear again on the compilation album 40 Seasons: The Best of Skid Row.

The EP features a guest appearance by Judas Priest frontman Rob Halford on "Delivering The Goods" (a Judas Priest cover). A different recording, also featuring Halford, was previously featured on the band's preceding EP B-Side Ourselves, from which it was released as a promo single, as well as the A Tribute to the Priest album.

Track listing

Personnel
Sebastian Bach – lead vocals
Dave "The Snake" Sabo – guitar, backing vocals
Scotti Hill – guitar, backing vocals
Rachel Bolan – bass, backing vocals
Rob Affuso – drums

Additional musicians
Rob Halford – guest vocals on "Delivering the Goods"

Production
Simon Efemey – engineering
Bruce Calder – mixing

References

External links

Fan website

Skid Row (American band) albums
1995 EPs
1995 live albums
East West Records EPs